The He zun is an ancient Chinese ritual bronze vessel of the zun shape.  It dates from the era of Western Zhou (1046–771 BC), specifically the early years of the dynasty, and is famous as the oldest artifact with the written characters meaning "Middle Kingdom" — : "China" — in a bronze inscription on the container.  Today it is in the Baoji Bronzeware Museum in Shaanxi.

Dimension and significance
The vessel, dating to the 5th year of the reign of King Cheng of Zhou, is 38.8cm tall, 28.8cm in diameter and weighs 14.6kg.  Inside the container, at the base, it contains 12 rows of 122 inscribed Chinese characters.  Of the 122 characters, 119 are identified while 3 are unknown. The inscription contains the phrase 宅𢆶𠁩或 inscribed in early Zhou form, structurally different to the modern form of the characters. The term here does not carry exactly the same semantic meaning as today, referring rather to the "central region" of the newly expanded Zhou dynasty political domain, but is the earliest occurrence in the Chinese corpus of the word , which gradually expanded in its meaning over the next millennium. The He zun is also the earliest known vessel bearing the character de ("virtue"), and one of only 64 historical artifacts that can never leave Chinese soil.

History
The construction of the city of Luoyi is documented in two chapters of the Classic of History.  The inscription of this vessel supports the textual claim.  Historians believe King Wu of Zhou was at Haojing after the construction of Luoyi.  The record shows King Cheng of Zhou established his residence in Chengzhou in his 5th year.  Most scholars consider this was the 5th year after Duke of Zhou handed over the government.

The inscription is (in Liding characters and with modern punctuations added):

The inscription has been translated as follows:

Discovery
The lost artifact was discovered by a Chen family. Behind their house in Baoji was a 3 metre tall cliff.  One cubic metre of the piece was sticking out from the soil.  In 1963 the second son of the family dug out the piece thinking that someone might be hurt by the protruding part.  The piece revealed a taotie design. The family did not grasp the value of the vessel, using it as a food storage container at home.  On August 8, 1965, the family struggled with financial difficulties and sold the piece along with other unneeded items to a waste center in Baoji for 30 yuan.

In September 1965 a worker in the waste center informed an expert about the bronze piece.  The expert recognised it as a Zhou dynasty artifact and brought it back to a museum.  In 1975, near the end of the Cultural revolution, the State Administration of Cultural Heritage sent the piece to the Shaanxi relic bureau.  Ma Chengyuan, a bronze expert at the Shanghai Museum, recognised its significance.

In 1976 the PRC cultural bureau organised an art exhibition to the United States.  The US requested this piece join the exhibit and offered a US$30 million protection coverage.

See also
 
 Names of China

References

Zhou dynasty bronzeware
History of Baoji
Names of China
1965 archaeological discoveries